Randall "Pee Wee" Anderson (July 17, 1959 – May 5, 2002) was an American professional wrestling referee and amateur wrestler who worked for the National Wrestling Alliance (NWA)'s Jim Crockett Promotions and World Championship Wrestling.

Professional wrestling career
Anderson was a childhood friend of Arn Anderson. He started out training for a professional wrestling career with Arn under the tutelage of Ted Allen. Anderson started working as a referee upon his graduation in 1978 in Mid-South Wrestling. He also refereed in Florida Championship Wrestling before arriving in the National Wrestling Alliance (NWA)'s Jim Crockett Promotions in 1985. He quickly rose up the referee ranks and was the referee for several main event matches. In 1988, when Ted Turner bought Crockett and renamed it World Championship Wrestling, Anderson stayed on. Anderson was the referee in charge of the main event six-man tag match at Bash at the Beach 1996 which saw the heel turn of Hulk Hogan and the formation of the New World Order (nWo).

From 1996 to 1997, Anderson played a role in the "hostile takeover" of WCW by the nWo. He refused to work on the September 23, 1996, episode of Monday Nitro after nWo members took control of the broadcast. Eric Bischoff and the nWo bullied him around. At Souled Out, nWo referee Nick Patrick was bumped and knocked out. Anderson came from the crowd to count the pinfall and award the tag team championship to the Steiner Brothers. Bischoff fired Anderson for interfering, but then decided to allow Anderson to wrestle Patrick to get his job back. Anderson defeated him by using a foreign object, from fellow WCW referee Jimmy Jett. Immediately following this match, Eric Bischoff reversed the decision and fired both Jett and Anderson. According to story line, Anderson was reinstated and reffed his first match, after being fired, on the March 10, 1997 episode of Nitro. Anderson continued as a referee in WCW until his battle with cancer forced him to retire in 1999.

Personal life
Anderson was an amateur wrestler in high school, winning a state championship in the 119-lb class.

Death
Anderson was diagnosed with testicular cancer at the age of 36. He was diagnosed after recognizing his symptoms while reading a medical magazine. Because of a malignant tumor, he had to have his left testicle removed. Anderson died on May 5, 2002 as a result of the testicular cancer. He was 42 years old. Anderson was survived by his wife Kristy, daughter Montana, and son Chase.

See also
 List of premature professional wrestling deaths

References

1959 births
2002 deaths
American male professional wrestlers
Deaths from cancer in Georgia (U.S. state)
Deaths from testicular cancer
Professional wrestlers from Georgia (U.S. state)
Professional wrestling referees